This is a list of South Carolina State Bulldogs football players in the NFL draft.

Key

Selections

References

South Carolina State

South Carolina State Bulldogs NFL draft